Chimelong International Ocean Tourist Resort is a theme park resort located in Hengqin, Zhuhai, China and owned by Chimelong Group. The resort currently consists of one theme park, two theaters and three themed hotels. With a 20 billion yuan investment, future plans for the resort include at least three additional theme parks, a new aerial tramway transportation system, an artificial island, and at least one additional hotel. Chimelong expects visitation at Chimelong International Ocean Resort to increase to over 50 million annually once all of the theme parks are operating.

Theme Parks

Chimelong Ocean Kingdom 
Chimelong Ocean Kingdom, designed by PGAV Destinations, is the resort's first theme park. The soft opening took place in January 2014 and the park officially opened in March 2014.

Chimelong Marine Science Park 
Chimelong Marine Science Park is the second theme park planned for Chimelong International Ocean Tourist Resort. This ocean-themed park masterplanned by Legacy Entertainment will be entirely indoors and will be connected to Chimelong Ocean Kingdom via pedestrian bridge and the aerial tramway. Construction on the park began on November 30, 2015 and it will open in 2021.

Chimelong Adventure Park 
Chimelong Adventure Park is the planned third theme park at Chimelong International Ocean Tourist Resort. This outdoor theme park will be located at the peak of Hengqin Island's mountain range. The theme park will be accessed by aerial tramway. Early plans for this theme park included a wooden roller coaster, observation wheel, and observation tower.

Chimelong Animal Kingdom 
Chimelong Animal Kingdom, a fourth theme park planned for the resort features day time and night time safari components centered around live animals, with masterplan design by Dan Pearlman.

Entertainment Venues 
Hengqin Island Theater is a large indoor theater located at the center of Chimelong International Ocean Tourist Resort. Performances of Chimelong Hengqin International Circus City take place at the venue every evening and the theater hosts the annual China International Circus Festival.

A new, larger indoor theater named The Chimelong Theatre opened on July 26, 2019, becoming the resort's primary circus theater venue.

Chimelong Fortune Island Reclamation Project 
In July 2017, Chimelong Group submitted to the local government plans to build an artificial island off the coast of Hengqin Island. Plans for the island include a marine theater and marine museum. Early design plans for Chimelong International Ocean Tourist Resort show the island having a large marina.

Transportation Systems 
Chimelong International Ocean Tourist Resort is primarily accessed by bus or car and guests travel around the property by walking or by taking a boat ride on the resort's central canal.

Canal Boat Ride 
Small boats for guests travel on a canal located at the center of the resort. Guests can board and debark the boats at Chimelong Hengqin Bay Hotel, Hengqin Island Theater and Chimelong Penguin Hotel.

China Railway 
Zhuhai Changlong railway station, a station on Zhuji intercity railway, is located near the resort. It is operated by China Railway Guangzhou Group.

Aerial lift 
In December 2017, an article written about Chimelong Group's founder, Su Zhigang, revealed plans for an aerial lift at Chimelong International Ocean Tourist Resort. The aerial lift system will be manufactured by Poma and the stations will be located near Chimelong Ocean Kingdom, Chimelong Adventure Park, and Chimelong Marine Science Park. The first license for one of the aerial lift's stations was approved by the local government in December 2018.

Hotels

There are three hotels on site with a fourth currently under construction:
 Chimelong Hengqin Bay Hotel – 1,888-room hotel. Chimelong Hengqin Bay Hotel was awarded the World's Leading Themed Hotel in the 2015 World Travel Awards (WTA).
 Chimelong Circus Hotel – 700-room hotel. Opened on 19 February 2015.

 Chimelong Penguin Hotel – 2,000-room hotel with "Emperor Penguin Cafeteria" that enables guests to enjoy meals while observing penguins in proximity. Opened on 19 February 2015.
Chimelong Marine Science Hotel – Modern 26 floor tower that includes restaurants, conference rooms, swimming pools, and retail stores. Connected to the back of Chimelong Marine Science Park. Currently under construction.

References

External links 
 

Zhuhai
Amusement parks in China
2014 establishments in China
Tourist attractions in Guangdong
Amusement parks opened in 2014